X.X.X. Live Tour is the second headlining concert tour by Hong Kong singer G.E.M. The tour was launched in support of her studio album Xposed (2012). The tour began on April 12, 2013 in the singers native Hong Kong and continued throughout 2014 and 2015 travelling across China, Asia, North America before concluding the tour in London, United Kingdom on the 22nd November, 2015.

In April, she held five concerts in Hong Kong Coliseum, and became the youngest artist who has held 10 concerts in Hong Kong Coliseum.。

In late April, G.E.M. has started a study tour for three months, so the sixth show held in September. In November, she had released the second live album, "G.E.M. X.X.X. Live", which included three tracks, "是否", "偶爾" and "我的秘密 My Secret".

Because of receiving the runner-up in I Am A Singer 2 in 2014, she had performed songs from the music TV show, I Am A Singer 2.The participation of the show helped her get famous in the Mainland China, hence, she held more concerts in China. She had finished 50 concerts under the age of 23 in August.

In 2015, her concert in Taiwan was held successfully, 15000 tickets had sold out within 4 hours.

In April 21, she held a press conference in Los Angeles and announced that she had cooperated with Live Nation, holding tour in America and Europe in November.

The 64th show in Beijing, was the first live concert that incorporated different mass media.

Shows

References

2013 concert tours
2014 concert tours
2015 concert tours